The Mary Vaughan Jones Award is a Welsh children's literature award. The Mary Vaughan Jones Trophy is awarded every three years to an author who has made a substantial contribution to children's literature over a number of years. It was established in memory of Mary Vaughan Jones's contribution to the field of children's books in Wales.

Awards
1985 - Ifor Owen
1988 - Emily Huws
1991 - T. Llew Jones
1994 - W.J. Jones
1997 - Roger Boore
2000 - J. Selwyn Lloyd
2003 - Elfyn Pritchard
2006 - Mair Wynn Hughes
2009 - Angharad Tomos
2012 - Jac Jones
2015 - Siân Lewis
2018 - Gareth F. Williams
2021 - Menna Lloyd Williams

References

British children's literary awards
Welsh literary awards
Literary awards honoring lifetime achievement
Awards established in 1985
1985 establishments in the United Kingdom